Crimean Gothic was an East Germanic language spoken by the Crimean Goths in some isolated locations in Crimea until the late 18th century.

Attestation
The existence of a Germanic dialect in Crimea is noted in a number of sources from the 9th century to the 18th century. However, only a single source provides any details of the language itself: a letter by the Flemish ambassador Ogier Ghiselin de Busbecq, dated 1562 and first published in 1589, gives a list of some eighty words and a song supposedly in the language.

Busbecq's account is problematic in a number of ways. First, his informants were not unimpeachable; one was a Greek speaker who knew Crimean Gothic as a second language, and the other was a Goth who had abandoned his native language in favour of Greek. Second, Busbecq's transcription was likely influenced by his own language, a Flemish dialect of Dutch. Finally, there are undoubted typographical errors in known extant versions of the account.

Nonetheless, much of the vocabulary cited by Busbecq is unmistakably Germanic and was recognised by him as such:

  Medial -- in the Biblical Gothic examples represents .

Busbecq also cites a number of words which he did not recognise but which are now known to have Germanic cognates:

  archaic

In 1780, Stanisław Bohusz Siestrzeńcewicz, an Archbishop of Mogilev, visited the southern coast of Crimea and Sevastopol. According to his account, he met some Tatars who spoke a language similar to Low German; this was probably a form of Crimean Gothic.

Identification and classification
While the initial identification of this language as "Gothic" probably rests on ethnological rather than linguistic grounds — that is, the speakers were identified as Goths, and therefore the language must be Gothic — it appears to share a number of distinctive phonological developments with the Gothic of Ulfilas' Bible.

There are also examples of features preserved in Crimean Gothic and Biblical Gothic but which have undergone changes in West and North Germanic. For example, both Crimean Gothic and Biblical Gothic preserve Germanic  as a sibilant, while it became  in all other Germanic dialects: Crimean Gothic  and Biblical Gothic  vs. German , all meaning 'he'. This  is lost in all North Germanic languages which have forms descending from Old Norse  and all West Germanic languages, which have forms descending from : Old English , Old Saxon , Old High German .

However, there are problems in assuming that Crimean Gothic simply represents a later stage in the development of the Gothic attested in Ulfilas' Bible. Some innovations in Biblical Gothic are not found in Crimean Gothic. For example:
 Crimean Gothic preserves Germanic , whereas in Biblical Gothic it has become , e.g. Crimean Gothic  and  vs. Biblical Gothic  and 
 Crimean Gothic preserves Germanic  before , whereas Biblical Gothic has , e.g. Crimean Gothic  vs. Biblical Gothic .

Several historical accounts mention similarity of Crimean Gothic to Low German, as well as the intelligibility of Crimean Gothic to German speakers, with the Dutch-speaking Busbecq's account being by far the most important.

There are two alternative solutions: that Crimean Gothic presents a separate branch of East Germanic, distinct from Ulfilas' Gothic; or that Crimean Gothic is actually descended from the dialect of West Germanic settlers who migrated to Crimea in the early Middle Ages and whose language was subsequently influenced by Gothic. Both of these possibilities were first suggested in the 19th century and are most recently argued by Stearns and Grønvik, respectively. While there is no consensus on a definitive solution to this problem, it is accepted that Crimean Gothic is not a descendant of Biblical Gothic.

The song recorded by Busbecq is less obviously Germanic and has proved impossible to interpret definitively. There is no consensus as to whether it is actually in Crimean Gothic.

Other sources 
The only non-Busbecqian additions to this very small corpus are two potentially Crimean Gothic terms from other sources: the first is a proper name, found in a Hebrew inscription on a grave stone dating from the 5th century AD; the second word,  ("house"), may have lived on as a loan word meaning "roof lath" in the Crimean Tatar language.

In 2015, five Gothic inscriptions were found by Andrey Vinogradov, a Russian historian, on stone plates excavated in Mangup in 1938, and deciphered by him and Maksim Korobov. The inscriptions were written in the second half of the 9th century or in the first half of the 10th century.

One of them is a Biblical Gothic version of Psalm 77:13. It is not included in the known manuscripts of the Gothic Bible (which mostly preserve New Testament texts), but the orthography and phrasing matches that of Wulfila's Bible. In the inscription, it is followed by a sentence which does not come from the Bible, but again copies or mimics Biblical Gothic:

"Who is so great a God as our God? Thou art the God that doest wonders. 
One rose in eternity from the dead and in the world ..."

The Mangup inscriptions may be viewed as a translation of a Byzantine formula.
 

"Lord, help your servant Damjanus from [the] vine[yard?] and the sinner"

References

Notes

Sources
 MacDonald Stearns, Crimean Gothic. Analysis and Etymology of the Corpus, Saratoga 1978. Includes Latin text of Busbecq's report and English translation.
 MacDonald Stearns, "Das Krimgotische". In: Heinrich Beck (ed.), Germanische Rest- und Trümmersprachen, Berlin/New York 1989, 175–194.
 Ottar Grønvik, Die dialektgeographische Stellung des Krimgotischen und die krimgotische cantilena, Oslo 1983.

External links
Busbecq's account, in Latin
 Gothic Online by Todd B. Krause and Jonathan Slocum, free online lessons at the Linguistics Research Center at the University of Texas at Austin, contains a lesson on Crimean Gothic
  Editions and Critical Studies, bibliography by Christian T. Petersen

Gothic language
Gothic, Crimean
Extinct languages of Europe
Languages extinct in the 18th century